Rio Rita is a 1942 American comedy film directed by S. Sylvan Simon and starring Abbott and Costello. It was based upon the 1927 Flo Ziegfeld Broadway musical, which was previously made into a 1929 film also titled Rio Rita that starred the comedy team of Wheeler & Woolsey. Kathryn Grayson (in her first starring picture) and John Carroll replace the 1929 version's Bebe Daniels and John Boles.

Plot
Nazi spies have infiltrated the Hotel Vista del Rio, a resort on the Mexican border. They plan to use a radio broadcast by a famous guest, Ricardo Montera, to transmit coded messages to their cohorts. Doc and Wishy are stowaways in Montera's car, who steal a basket of "apples" that turn out being miniature radios used by the spies. Rita Winslow, the hotel's owner and childhood sweetheart of Montera, hire Doc and Wishy as house detectives, who discover the Nazi codebook and give it to Montera. They are then kidnapped by the spies, and left in a room with a bomb set to explode, but manage to escape while Wishy plants the bomb in the pocket of one of the culprits. Meanwhile, the broadcast has already begun and Montera, refusing to participate in treason, fights the spies until the Texas Rangers arrive. The spies' escape by car is thwarted when the planted bomb finally explodes.

Cast

Production
This was the first of three films that Abbott and Costello made on loan to Metro-Goldwyn-Mayer while under contract to Universal Pictures; the other two pictures being Lost in a Harem and Abbott and Costello in Hollywood.

It was filmed from November 10, 1941 through January 14, 1942, and included location shooting near Palm Springs, California.

It was during filming that Abbott and Costello had their hand and footprints enshrined at Grauman's Chinese Theater on December 8, 1941. The duo also signed a new agreement regarding their partnership on January 9, 1942. Costello would now earn 60 percent of their salary with Abbott taking 40 percent.

Joe Kirk, who later played Mr. Bacciagalupe in The Abbott and Costello Show, has a small role. (Kirk later became Costello's brother-in-law).

Reception
The film earned $1,927,000 in the US and Canada and $1,293,000 elsewhere during its initial theatrical release, making MGM a profit of $1,340,000.

Home media
This film, along with Abbott and Costello Meet Captain Kidd, were released on DVD on April 1, 2011 by Warner Bros. on the WB Archive Collection.

References

External links

 
 
 

Abbott and Costello films
1942 films
Metro-Goldwyn-Mayer films
American black-and-white films
Remakes of American films
Films directed by S. Sylvan Simon
Films shot in California
1942 romantic comedy films
American romantic comedy films
Films based on musicals
1940s English-language films
1940s American films